Christopher Beaumont, 23rd Seigneur of Sark is the present Seigneur of Sark in the Channel Islands. He is a former British Army officer.

Biography

Beaumont was educated at Clifton College and the Royal Military Academy Sandhurst, before taking up a career as a regular officer of the British Army. He succeeded as Seigneur of Sark on 3 July 2016, on the death of his father Michael Beaumont. He then returned to live on the island.

On 5 July 2016, the Sark Newspaper  published an article which noted the new Seigneur's "impressive CV" and commented "Keen observers suggest that he is a man who will not be swayed by past convention. When on Sark he has often been seen to visit cafés and restaurants which are otherwise rigidly boycotted by members and supporters of Sark's one ruling party. For now, the people of Sark can only wait and hope that their new Seigneur will work to build a secure and prosperous future for each and every Islander." The newspaper hoped Beaumont would re-occupy La Seigneurie, the traditional residence of the Seigneur, and appealed for an economic plan to address local unemployment.

In an interview with the BBC on 15 July 2016, Beaumont defended Sark's feudal structure and the Island's legislature, the Chief Pleas, saying: "There's a perfectly good, working Chief Pleas, and it gets my full support." Constitutional reforms in 2008, which had the approval of his father the 22nd Seigneur, had devolved some of the feudal authority of the Seigneur to the legislature.

In 2009, after ill-health triggered Beaumont's parents to move out of the Seigneurie to a smaller cottage on the estate, they arranged for tenants to live in the Seigneurie for ten years, in return for making renovations.

References

Living people
Royal Engineers officers
Seigneurs of Sark
Place of birth missing (living people)
1957 births
Graduates of the Royal Military Academy Sandhurst
People educated at Clifton College